Redberry Lake is a lake near Hafford in the Canadian province of Saskatchewan. It is a medium-sized saline lake within an area characterized by mostly freshwater aquatic environments. The lake makes up the core protected area of the Redberry Lake (UNESCO) Biosphere Reserve, and is a federal bird sanctuary of the same name. It is an Important Bird Area (IBA) of Canada designated as Redberry Lake (SK 005). A small regional park is situated at the north-west corner of the lake. The countryside surrounding Redberry Lake is typical of the aspen parkland biome of which it is a part.

Redberry Lake Regional Park 
Redberry Lake Regional Park offers camping, golfing, swimming, hiking, boating, and many bird watching opportunities. Although there are no sport fish in the lake itself, the park has installed a small earthen dam on a creek which flows into the lake, creating a freshwater trout pond.

See also 
List of lakes of Saskatchewan
List of protected areas of Saskatchewan

References 

Lakes of Saskatchewan
Biosphere reserves of Canada
Redberry No. 435, Saskatchewan
Migratory Bird Sanctuaries of Canada
Protected areas of Saskatchewan
Division No. 16, Saskatchewan
Important Bird Areas of Saskatchewan